Kathy Irene Javner is an American politician serving as a member of the Maine House of Representatives from the 141st district. Elected in November 2018, she assumed office on December 5, 2018.

Early life and education 
Javner was born and raised in Chester, Maine. She graduated from Bethany Global University.

Career 
Javner was elected to the Maine House of Representatives in November 2018 and assumed office on December 5, 2018. Since 2019, she has been a member of the House Health and Human Services Committee.

References 

Year of birth missing (living people)
Living people
People from Penobscot County, Maine
Republican Party members of the Maine House of Representatives
Women state legislators in Maine
Bethany Global University alumni